Brian Scott Williams (born June 8, 1966) is a former American football center in the National Football League (NFL) who played for the New York Giants from 1989 to 1999.  He played college football at the University of Minnesota and was drafted in the first round (18th overall) of the 1989 NFL Draft.

Williams is the oldest son of Robert Williams, a former quarterback at the University of Notre Dame who was also drafted in the NFL by the Chicago Bears in the 1959 NFL Draft.  Williams has a son, Maxx, who currently plays tight end for the Arizona Cardinals.

See also
 History of the New York Giants (1979–93)
 History of the New York Giants (1994–present)

References

Living people
1966 births
New York Giants players
American football centers
Minnesota Golden Gophers football players
Sportspeople from Mt. Lebanon, Pennsylvania
Players of American football from Pennsylvania